Joel Kenneth Kuhnel (born February 19, 1995) is an American professional baseball pitcher for the Cincinnati Reds of Major League Baseball (MLB).

Amateur career
Kuhnel attended Sunrise Mountain High School in Peoria, Arizona. Undrafted in the 2013 Major League Baseball draft, he enrolled at Central Arizona College where he played college baseball. 

As a freshman at Central Arizona in 2014, Kuhnel pitched to a 2–0 record with a 1.62 ERA over 39 innings. After the season, he transferred to the University of Texas at Arlington. In 2015, his first season with UTA, he went 4–4 with a 3.55 ERA over 16 games (12 starts). As a junior in 2016, Kuhnel compiled a 6–4 record with a 2.99 ERA across 12 starts. After the year, he was selected by the Cincinnati Reds in the 11th round of the 2016 Major League Baseball draft.

Professional career
Kuhnel signed with the Reds and made his professional debut with the Billings Mustangs, pitching to a 0–1 record and a 3.43 ERA over 18 relief appearances. In 2017, he pitched with the Dayton Dragons and compiled a 2–4 record, a 4.36 ERA, and 54 strikeouts over 64 relief innings pitched, and in 2018, he played for the Daytona Tortugas, with whom he was named a Florida State League All-Star, going 1–4 with a 3.04 ERA in 44 games pitched out of the bullpen. Kuhnel began 2019 with the Chattanooga Lookouts, earning Southern League All-Star honors, and was promoted to the Louisville Bats in June. Over 41 relief appearances between the two teams, he went 5-3 with a 2.18 ERA and fifty strikeouts over  innings.

On August 15, 2019, the Reds selected Kuhnel's contract and promoted him to the major leagues. He made his major league debut on August 16 versus the St. Louis Cardinals. He pitched a total of  innings for the Reds in 2019, going 1-0 with a 4.66 ERA and nine strikeouts. In 2020, Kuhnel pitched to a 6.00 ERA over three games and three innings pitched. On October 26, 2020, he was outrighted off of the 40-man roster. He spent all of 2021 in the minor leagues, but missed a majority of the season while dealing with a shoulder injury, and pitched only eight innings throughout the course of the year.

He was assigned to Triple-A Louisville to begin the 2022 season. On May 8, 2022, Kuhnel was selected to the 40-man and active rosters.

References

External links

1995 births
Living people
People from Goldsboro, North Carolina
Baseball players from North Carolina
Major League Baseball pitchers
Cincinnati Reds players
Central Arizona Vaqueros baseball players
UT Arlington Mavericks baseball players
Billings Mustangs players
Dayton Dragons players
Daytona Tortugas players
Chattanooga Lookouts players
Louisville Bats players